Michal Poluch (born 6 June 1991) is a Slovak football defender who currently plays for FC Topoľčany.

Career

FC Nitra
He made his debut for FC Nitra against FK Senica on 12 May 2012.

External links
FC Nitra profile

References

1991 births
Living people
Slovak footballers
Association football defenders
FC Nitra players
Slovak Super Liga players